Blue Money is a 1985 English television comedy film written by Stewart Parker, directed by Colin Bucksey and starring Tim Curry, Debby Bishop and Billy Connolly.

Plot 
A taxi driver and aspiring actor-singer Larry Gormley (Tim Curry) becomes entangled with gangsters when he steals a briefcase full of money that was left behind in his cab.

Cast 
Tim Curry as Larry Gormley
Debby Bishop as Pam Hodge
Billy Connolly as Des
Frances Tomelty as Fidelma 
George Irving as Ramirez

Production 
The film was written by Parker specifically for Curry to showcase his mimicry and singing skills as he covers songs and impersonates many musicians throughout the film, including Mick Jagger and Billie Holiday.

References

External links
 

British comedy films
1985 films
1985 comedy films
1980s British films